The 1964 Miami Redskins football team was an American football team that represented Miami University in the Mid-American Conference (MAC) during the 1964 NCAA University Division football season. In their second season under Schembechler, the Redskins compiled a 6–3–1 record (4–2 against MAC opponents), finished in a tie for second place in the MAC, and outscored all opponents by a combined total of 210 to 142.  On October 17, 1964, in what is regarded as one of the great victories in Miami football history, Miami defeated Northwestern, by a 28 to 27 score.

The team's statistical leaders included quarterback Ernie Kellermann with 1,260 passing yards, Don Peddie with 691 rushing yards, and John Erisman with 392 receiving yards. Kellerman was selected as the team's most valuable player and was also a first-team All-MAC selection. Kellerman, Mike Cohen, and Bill Williams were the team captains.

Schedule

References

Miami
Miami RedHawks football seasons
Miami Redskins football